Asellota is a suborder of isopod crustaceans found in marine and freshwater environments. Roughly one-quarter of all marine isopods belong to this suborder. Members of this suborder are readily distinguished from other isopods by their complex copulatory apparatus. Other characteristics include six-jointed antennal peduncle, the styliform uropods (a character shared with some other isopod groups), the fusion of pleonites 5, 4 and sometimes 3 to the pleotelson, and absence of the first pleopod in females.

Classification
The suborder Asellota comprises these families: Some classifications also include the Microcerberidea within Asellota.

Janiroidea Sars, 1897
Acanthaspidiidae Menzies, 1962
Dendrotiidae Vanhöffen, 1914
Desmosomatidae Sars, 1899
Echinothambematidae Menzies, 1956
Haplomunnidae Wilson, 1976
Haploniscidae Hansen, 1916
Ischnomesidae Hansen, 1916
Janirellidae Menzies, 1956
Janiridae Sars, 1897
Joeropsis Koehler, 1885
Joeropsididae Nordenstam, 1933
Katianiridae Svavarsson, 1987
Macrostylidae Hansen, 1916
Mesosignidae Schultz, 1969
Microparasellidae Karaman, 1933
Mictosomatidae Wolff, 1965
Munnidae Sars, 1897
Munnopsidae Lilljeborg, 1864
Nannoniscidae Hansen, 1916
Paramunnidae Vanhöffen, 1914
Pleurocopidae Fresi & Schiecke, 1972
Santiidae Wilson, 1987
Thambematidae Stebbing, 1913

Aselloidea Latreille, 1802
Asellidae Latreille, 1802
Stenasellidae Dudich, 1924
Stenetrioidea Hansen, 1905
Pseudojaniridae Wilson, 1986
Stenetriidae Hansen, 1905
Gnathostenetroidoidea Kussakin, 1967
Gnathostenetroididae Kussakin, 1967
Protojaniridae Fresi, Idato & Scipione, 1980
Vermectiadidae Just & Poore, 1992

References

External links

 
Isopoda